Raghunandan Sharma (Rajgarh) is a former Indian legislator. He was the Member of the Legislative Assembly from Rajgarh, Madhya Pradesh. He is also a member of Bharatiya Janata Party's (BJP) National Council and Madhya Pradesh State BJP Working Committee. Sharma represented Rajgarh in the Madhya Pradesh Legislative Assembly for consecutive two terms, from 1990 - 1998.

Childhood and Education
Sharma was born in the village of Khujner in District Rajgarh on 19 January 1950. He was influenced by the ideologies of the Rashtriya Swayamsevak Sangh from an early age. He served as District College General Secretary from Jansangh.

Early Youth and Political Career
After completing his BA and LLB, Sharma wanted to be a lawyer, however due to poor economic background, he had to take up job of a Clerk in District Collectorate. In 1990, Sharma joined politics and fought for MLA on BJPs' ticket. Sharma won this election with a margin of 19,000 votes. Elections were re-held in the state in 1993 after the revoking of President's Rule and Sharma won his second term by a margin of mere 274 votes.

Sharma held various other positions such as State President of "Gurjar Gaur Brahmin Sabha" between 1990- 1995, Member of State and National Council of BJP (2010 - 2013), District President of BJP (2012 - 2015). Most Recently (2016 - 2018) Raghunandan Sharma was nominated as Vice Chairman (Minister of State Awarded) of Khadi and Village Industries Board by Govt of Madhya Pradesh.

Beyond politics, Sharma is also owner and Editor-in-Chief of a Monthly Political Magazine named "Nevaj".

Social Work
Sharma is part of various Social Organizations, Religious trusts and NGOs. He started his own trust called "Nirvindhya" aimed to help make cleaning of rivers a social movement.

Personal life
Raghunandan Sharma is Married to Smt. Krishna Sharma . They have two sons and two daughters.

References

External links
 http://eci.nic.in/archive/electionanalysis/AE/S12/partycomp164.htm
 http://fisiusa.org/fisi_News_items/news48.htm
 http://www.dailypioneer.com/231024/BJP-announces-dist-election-in-charges.html
 http://www.indianexpress.com/oldStory/34519
 http://in.jagran.yahoo.com/news/local/madhyapradesh/4_7_6399953/

Living people
People from Rajgarh district
Madhya Pradesh MLAs 1990–1992
Madhya Pradesh MLAs 1993–1998
Bharatiya Janata Party politicians from Madhya Pradesh
Year of birth missing (living people)